Dysoxylum carolinae is a tree in the family Meliaceae. It is named for the English botanist Caroline Pannell.

Description
The bark is grey to dark brown. The flowers are citronella-scented.

Distribution and habitat
Dysoxylum carolinae is found in Vietnam and western Malesia. Its habitat is forests from sea-level to  altitude.

References

carolinae
Trees of Vietnam
Trees of Sumatra
Trees of Peninsular Malaysia
Trees of Borneo
Plants described in 1994